The Environment Protection Authority Victoria (EPA) is Victoria’s environmental regulator. EPA is an independent statutory authority, established in 1971 under the Environment Protection Act 1970 (EP Act). EPA's role is to prevent and reduce the harmful effects of pollution and waste on Victorians and their environment.

EPA sits within the portfolio of Energy, Environment and Climate Change; the Minister of which is the Hon. Lily D’Ambrosio MP as of December 2019.

History
Established under the Environment Protection Act 1970, EPA is the world's third oldest environmental regulatory agency. It was established to address environmental problems across the state in a systematic and integrated way, bringing together a range of legislation and powers to be administered by a central authority.

In July 2021 the Environment Protection Amendment Act 2018 will come into effect, transforming the structure under which EPA works. The cornerstone of the new Act is the general environmental duty, which states that all persons (i.e. legal entities, including corporations) who are undertaking any activity which poses a risk of harm to human health or to the environment has a duty to minimise those risks so far as is reasonably practicable.

In 2023, the EPA investigated an oil spill that was effecting the water of St Kilda Beach, Victoria and the neighboring Elwood Beach. Swimmers were advised to avoid going into the water due to an oily substance that was found in the water. The organizations was also investigating reports of dead fish turning up on the beach and whether it was related to the oil.

Authorised Officers 
The EP Act allows EPA to appoint individuals to the role of authorised officer. The appointed officers can then exercise powers given to them under the EP Act.

The primary role of EPA’s authorised officers is to ensure that businesses, government and individuals comply with the EP Act. They do this by:

 inspecting businesses and premises
 providing guidance and advice about how to comply
 enforcing the law – requiring risks and impacts to be remedied
 where necessary, applying sanctions or punishment to deter non-compliance.

EPA has authorised officers working in specialised areas such as motor vehicles and litter, who only exercise powers specific to their roles. See EPA authorisations: roles and powers policy (Publication 1478) for more information.

The EPA Authorised Officers brochure (Publication 1422) provides the community and EPA duty holders, such as EPA licensed and non-licensed businesses, with an easy-to-understand summary of the role and powers of authorised officers.

Informants 
EPA informants are authorised officers who lead and conduct major investigations undertaken by EPA. As part of this role, informants:

 are appointed to undertake legal proceedings in a court of law, on behalf of EPA, for offences against all legislation administered by EPA
 are delegated the power to issue a notice of contravention to formally advise the recipient that they are contravening a legal requirement and apply a daily penalty. A notice of contravention will be issued where there is a major ongoing contravention and further enforcement action is planned; and prepare briefs of evidence.

Senior staff 
Managers and team leaders responsible for licensing, works approvals, permitting, notifiable chemicals and planning referrals, are delegated to decide on applications for approvals and to respond to planning referrals.

Where a remedial notice requires the recipient to undertake works at a cost above a certain level, the power to approve the remedial notice is delegated to specific EPA managers and executives from EPA's Regional Services Directorate, and the CEO.

Organisation 
EPA maintains seven distinct regional offices designed so that the authority can respond effectively to local issues and events. As of December 2019 these regions are:

 North Metro Region, headquartered in Preston.
 West Metro Region, headquartered in Sunshine.
 South Metro Region, headquartered in Dandenong.
 South West Region, headquartered in Geelong.
 North West Region, headquartered in Bendigo.
 North East Region, headquartered in Wangarrata.
 Gippsland Region, headquartered in Traralgon.

See also 
Waste management in Australia

References

Government agencies of Victoria (Australia)
1971 establishments in Australia
Victoria
Environment of Victoria (Australia)
Environmental agencies in Australia